Jacqueline Risset was a French poet noted for her work on the board of the literary journal Tel Quel along with Julia Kristeva and Philippe Sollers, and for her translations of Italian poetry into French.  Risset's books include Sleep's Powers and The Translation Begins.

Risset was born in Besançon, in 1936 and died in Rome on September 4, 2014.

She taught French literature at the University La Sapienza in Rome.

Jennifer Moxley's translation of Sleep's Powers was published by Ugly Duckling Presse in 2008.

Further reading
 Tel Quel

External links
 The translation begins.
 Jacqueline_Risset Bibliography Biblioteca Guillaume Apollinaire, Università degli studi Roma Tre
 Contemporary Women Poets

References 

1936 births
2014 deaths
Writers from Besançon
Italian–French translators
Translators to Italian
French literary critics
Women literary critics
French women poets
French women critics
French essayists
French women essayists
Academic staff of the Sapienza University of Rome
20th-century French poets
Prix Roger Caillois recipients
20th-century French women writers
20th-century French translators